Scanniello Peak is a peak which rises to 2200m and marks the highest and SW-most point of Tekapo Ridge in Kyle Hills, Ross Island. Named by Advisory Committee on Antarctic Names (US-ACAN) (2000) after Jeffrey Scanniello, long-term ASA field engineer, who was active in surveying at McMurdo and South Pole Stations from 1990; member of McMurdo Station winter party, 1994.

Mountains of Ross Island